Pingjiang District is a former district of Suzhou in Jiangsu Province.

The postal code for Pingjiang District is 215005 and the telephone code is 0512.

On 1 September 2012, Pingjiang District was merged with Canglang District and Jinchang District to form Gusu District.

The district contains the historic Pingjiang Road.

See also
 Pingjiang Road

Administrative divisions of Suzhou
County-level divisions of Jiangsu
1955 establishments in China